Alicja Maria Szemplińska (born 29 April 2002), also known mononymously as Alicja, is a Polish singer. She won season 10 of The Voice of Poland in 2019. The following year, she won Poland's national Eurovision selection competition Szansa na sukces with her song "Empires", which she would have performed at the second semi-final of the Eurovision Song Contest 2020 in Rotterdam on 14 May 2020. On 18 March 2020, the contest was cancelled due to the COVID-19 pandemic. Although Alicja expressed her desire to represent Poland in the Eurovision Song Contest 2021, she was ultimately not chosen to represent Poland again and Rafał Brzozowski was chosen instead.

Discography

Singles
 "Prawie my" (2019)
 "Empires" (2020)
 "Gdzieś" (2020)
 "Pusto" (2020)
 "Kolęda dla Nieobecnych" (2020)
 "Na Pamięć" (2020)
 "Growing Up" (2021)
 "Ej, stop!" (2021)
 "Spójrz" (2021)
 "IDK" (2022)
 "Movin' On" (2022)
 "W Moim Garażu" (2022)
 "Sekret" (2022)
 "Stick Together" (2022)
 "New Home" (2023)

References

2002 births
Living people
The Voice (franchise) contestants
Eurovision Song Contest entrants of 2020
Eurovision Song Contest entrants for Poland
21st-century Polish women singers
21st-century Polish singers
People from Ciechanów